Narbonne plage is a resort on the southern (Mediterranean) coast of France in the Aude department. It is separated from the city of Narbonne by the limestone massif Montagne de la Clape and lies at its foot.

The town is heavily dependent upon the tourist trade. The beach currently holds blue flag status, an award it has held on multiple occasions.

References

External links
tourist office on archive.org
tourist office (in French)

Geography of Aude
Narbonne
Tourist attractions in Aude